Hazardous waste is waste that has substantial or potential threats to public health or the environment. Hazardous waste is a type of dangerous goods. They usually have one or more of the following hazardous traits:ignitability, reactivity, corrosivity, toxicity. Listed hazardous wastes are materials specifically listed by regulatory authorities as hazardous wastes which are from non-specific sources, specific sources, or discarded chemical products. Hazardous wastes may be found in different physical states such as gaseous, liquids, or solids. A hazardous waste is a special type of waste because it cannot be disposed of by common means like other by-products of our everyday lives. Depending on the physical state of the waste, treatment and solidification processes might be required.

The Basel Convention on the Control of Transboundary Movements of Hazardous Wastes and Their Disposal was signed by 199 countries and went into force in 1992. Plastic was added to the convention in 2019.

Amount
Worldwide, the United Nations Environment Programme (UNEP) estimated that more than 400 million tons of hazardous wastes are produced universally each year, mostly by industrialized countries (Schmit, 1999). About 1 percent of this is shipped across international boundaries, with the majority of the transfers occurring between countries in the Organization for the Economic Cooperation and Development (OECD) (Krueger, 1999). One of the reasons for industrialized countries to ship the hazardous waste to industrializing countries for disposal is the rising cost of disposing of hazardous waste in the home country.

The Basel Convention on the Control of Transboundary Movements of Hazardous Wastes and Their Disposal was signed by 199 countries and went into force in 1992. Plastic was added to the convention in 2019.

Types

Universal wastes 
Universal wastes are a special category of hazardous wastes that (in the U.S.) generally pose a lower threat relative to other hazardous wastes, are ubiquitous and produced in very large quantities by a large number of generators. Some of the most common "universal wastes" are: fluorescent light bulbs, some specialty batteries (e.g. lithium or lead containing batteries), cathode ray tubes, and mercury-containing devices.

Universal wastes are subject to somewhat less stringent regulatory requirements. Small quantity generators of universal wastes may be classified as "conditionally exempt small quantity generators" (CESQGs) which release them from some of the regulatory requirements for the handling and storage hazardous wastes. Universal wastes must still be disposed of properly.

Household hazardous waste 

Household Hazardous Waste (HHW), also referred to as domestic hazardous waste or home generated special materials, is a waste that is generated from residential households. HHW only applies to waste coming from the use of materials that are labeled for and sold for "home use".  Waste generated by a company or at an industrial setting is not HHW.

The following list includes categories often applied to HHW.  It is important to note that many of these categories overlap and that many household wastes can fall into multiple categories:

 Paints and solvents
 Automotive wastes (used motor oil, antifreeze, etc.)
 Pesticides (insecticides, herbicides, fungicides, etc.)
 Mercury-containing wastes (thermometers, switches, fluorescent lighting, etc.)
 Electronics (computers, televisions, cell phones)
 Aerosols / Propane cylinders
 Caustics / Cleaning agents
 Refrigerant-containing appliances
 Some specialty batteries  (e.g. lithium, nickel cadmium, or button cell batteries)
 Ammunition
 Asbestos
 Car batteries
 Radioactive wastes (some home smoke detectors are classified as radioactive waste because they contain very small amounts of radioactive isotope americium - see: Disposing of Smoke Detectors).
 Smoke from chimneys

Disposal 
Historically, some hazardous wastes were disposed of in regular landfills. This resulted in unfavorable amounts of hazardous materials seeping into the ground. These chemicals eventually entered to natural hydrologic systems. Many landfills now require countermeasures against groundwater contamination. For example, a barrier has to be installed along the foundation of the landfill to contain the hazardous substances that may remain in the disposed waste. Currently, hazardous wastes must often be stabilized and solidified in order to enter a landfill and must undergo different treatments in order to stabilize and dispose of them. Most flammable materials can be recycled into industrial fuel. Some materials with hazardous constituents can be recycled, such as lead acid batteries.

Recycling
Some hazardous wastes can be recycled into new products. Examples may include lead–acid batteries or electronic circuit boards. When heavy metals in these types of ashes go through the proper treatment, they could bind to other pollutants and convert them into easier-to-dispose solids, or they could be used as pavement filling. Such treatments reduce the level of threat of harmful chemicals, like fly and bottom ash, while also recycling the safe product. There is a recycling center facility in Oxnard, CA. The city does not charge for any hazardous materials being disposed of, but there is a limit to how much you can bring per month. Other than hazardous waste, the city also allows you to dispose of electronic waste, light-bulbs, and batteries.

Incineration, destruction and waste-to-energy 
Hazardous waste may be "destroyed". For example, by incinerating them at a high temperature, flammable wastes can sometimes be burned as energy sources. For example, many cement kilns burn hazardous wastes like used oils or solvents. Today, incineration treatments not only reduce the amount of hazardous waste, but also generate energy from the gases released in the process. It is known that this particular waste treatment releases toxic gases produced by the combustion of byproduct or other materials which can affect the environment. However, current technology has developed more efficient incinerator units that control these emissions to a point where this treatment is considered a more beneficial option.  There are different types of incinerators which vary depending on the characteristics of the waste. Starved air incineration is another method used to treat hazardous wastes. Just like in common incineration, burning occurs, however controlling the amount of oxygen allowed proves to be significant to reduce the amount of harmful byproducts produced. Starved air incineration is an improvement of the traditional incinerators in terms of air pollution. Using this technology, it is possible to control the combustion rate of the waste and therefore reduce the air pollutants produced in the process.

Hazardous waste landfill
Hazardous waste may be sequestered in a hazardous waste landfill  or permanent disposal facility. "In terms of hazardous waste, a landfill is defined as a disposal facility or part of a facility where hazardous waste is placed or on land and which is not a pile, a land treatment facility, a surface impoundment, an underground injection well, a salt dome formation, a salt bed formation, an underground mine, a cave, or a corrective action management unit (40 CFR 260.10)."

Pyrolysis 
Some hazardous waste types may be eliminated using pyrolysis in a high temperature not necessarily through electrical arc but starved of oxygen to avoid combustion.  However, when electrical arc is used to generate the required ultra heat (in excess of 3000 degree C temperature) all materials (waste) introduced into the process will melt into a molten slag and this technology is termed Plasma not pyrolysis. Plasma technology produces inert materials and when cooled solidifies into rock like material. These treatment methods are very expensive but may be preferable to high temperature incineration in some circumstances such as in the destruction of concentrated organic waste types, including PCBs, pesticides and other persistent organic pollutants.

Management and Health Effects
	Hazardous waste management and disposal comes with consequences if not done properly. If disposed of improperly, hazardous gaseous substances can be released into the air resulting in higher morbidity and mortality. These gaseous substances can include hydrogen chloride, carbon monoxide, nitrogen oxides, sulfur dioxide, and some may also include heavy metals. With the prospect of gaseous material being released into the atmosphere, several organizations (RCRA, TSCA, HSWA, CERCLA) developed an identification scale in which hazardous materials and wastes are categorized in order to be able to quickly identify and mitigate potential leaks. F-List materials were identified as non-specific industrial practices waste, K-List materials were wastes generated from specific industrial processes - pesticides, petroleum, explosive industries, and the P & U list were commercially used generated waste and shelf stable pesticides. Not only can mismanagement of hazardous wastes cause adverse direct health consequences through air pollution, mismanaged waste can also contaminate groundwater and soil. This creates disproportionately larger issues for those who depend heavily on the land for harvests and streams for drinking water - this includes Native American populations. Though all lower-class and/or social minorities are at a higher risk for being exposed to toxic exposure, Native Americans are at a multiplied risk due to the facts stated above (Brook, 1998). Improper disposal of hazardous waste has resulted in many extreme health complications within certain tribes. Members of the Mohawk Nation at Akwesasne have suffered elevated levels of PCB [Polychlorinated Biphenyls] in their bloodstreams leading to higher rates of cancer.

Society and culture

Global goals 
The international community has defined the responsible management of hazardous waste and chemicals as an important part of sustainable development by including it in Sustainable Development Goal 12. Target 12.4 of this goal is to "achieve the environmentally sound management of chemicals and all wastes throughout their life cycle". One of the indicators for this target is: "hazardous waste generated per capita; and proportion of hazardous waste treated, by type of treatment".

Regulatory history

In the United States

Resource Conservation and Recovery Act (RCRA)
Hazardous wastes are wastes with properties that make them dangerous or potentially harmful to human health or the environment. Hazardous wastes can be liquids, solids, contained gases, or sludges. They can be by-products of manufacturing processes or simply discarded commercial products, like cleaning fluids or pesticides. In regulatory terms, RCRA hazardous wastes are  wastes that appear on one of the four hazardous wastes lists (F-list, K-list, P-list, or U-list), or exhibit at least one of the following four characteristics; ignitability, corrosivity, reactivity, or toxicity. in the US, Hazardous wastes are regulated under the Resource Conservation and Recovery Act (RCRA), Subtitle C.

By definition, EPA determined that some specific wastes are hazardous. These wastes are incorporated into lists published by the Agency. These lists are organized into three categories: F-list (non-specific source wastes) found in the regulations at 40 CFR 261.31, K-list (source-specific wastes) found in the regulations at 40 CFR 261.32, and P-list and the U-list (discarded commercial chemical products) found in the regulations at 40 CFR 261.33.

RCRA's record keeping system helps to track the life cycle of hazardous waste and reduces the amount of hazardous waste illegally disposed.

Comprehensive Environmental Response, Compensation, and Liability Act 

The Comprehensive Environmental Response, Compensation, and Liability Act (CERCLA) was enacted in 1980.  The primary contribution of CERCLA was to create a "Superfund" and provide for the clean-up and remediation of closed and abandoned hazardous waste sites. CERCLA addresses historic releases of hazardous materials, but does not specifically manage hazardous wastes.

Country examples

United States 

In the United States, the treatment, storage, and disposal of hazardous waste are regulated under the Resource Conservation and Recovery Act (RCRA).  Hazardous wastes are defined under RCRA in 40 CFR 261 where they are divided into two major categories: characteristic wastes and listed wastes.

The requirements of the RCRA apply to all the companies that generate hazardous waste as well as those companies that store or dispose  hazardous waste in the United States. Many types of businesses generate hazardous waste. Dry cleaners, automobile repair shops, hospitals, exterminators, and photo processing centers may all generate hazardous waste. Some hazardous waste generators are larger companies such as chemical manufacturers, electroplating companies, and oil refineries.

A U.S. facility that treats, stores, or disposes of hazardous waste must obtain a permit for doing so under the RCRA. Generators and transporters of hazardous waste must meet specific requirements for handling, managing, and tracking waste. Through the RCRA, Congress directed the United States Environmental Protection Agency (EPA) to create regulations to manage hazardous waste. Under this mandate, the EPA developed strict requirements for all aspects of hazardous waste management including the treatment, storage, and disposal of hazardous waste. In addition to these federal requirements, states may develop more stringent requirements that are broader in scope than the federal regulations.  Furthermore, RCRA allows states to develop regulatory programs that are at least as stringent as RCRA and, after review by EPA, the states may take over responsibility for the implementation of the requirements under RCRA.  Most states take advantage of this authority, implementing their own hazardous waste programs that are at least as stringent, and in some cases are more stringent than the federal program.

The U.S. government provides several tools for mapping hazardous wastes to particular locations. These tools also allow the user to view additional information.

TOXMAP was a Geographic Information System (GIS) service from the Division of Specialized Information Services  of the United States National Library of Medicine (NLM) that used maps of the United States to help users visually explore data from the United States Environmental Protection Agency's (EPA) Toxics Release Inventory and Superfund Basic Research Program. This resource was funded by the US Federal Government. TOXMAP's chemical and environmental health information was taken from NLM's Toxicology Data Network (TOXNET), PubMed, and other authoritative sources.
The US Environmental Protection Agency (EPA) "Where You Live" allows users to select a region from a map to find information about Superfund sites in that region.

See also 

 Toxic waste
 Bamako Convention
 Brownfield Regulation and Development
 Environmental hazard
 Environmental remediation
 Environmental racism
 Gade v. National Solid Wastes Management Association
 List of solid waste treatment technologies
 List of Superfund sites in the United States
 List of waste management companies
 List of waste management topics
 List of waste types
 Mixed waste (radioactive/hazardous)
 National Priorities List (in the US)
 Pollution
 Recycling
 Retail hazardous waste
 Toxicity characteristic leaching procedure
 Triad (environmental science)
 Vapor intrusion

References

External links 
Agency for Toxic Substances and Disease Registry
 The EPA's hazardous waste page
 The U.S. EPA's Hazardous Waste Cleanup Information System
Waste Management: A Half Century of Progress, a report by the EPA Alumni Association

 
Environment and health
Occupational safety and health